Rohit Thakur is a Member of Legislative Assembly representing Jubbal-Kotkhai constituency in the Himachal Pradesh Legislative Assembly in India. He is the grandson of former chief minister of Himachal Pradesh Thakur Ram Lal. He is a member of Indian National Congress.

He graduated from Panjab University, Chandigarh with a degree in political science.

Electoral performance

References

Indian National Congress politicians from Himachal Pradesh
Living people
Himachal Pradesh MLAs 2017–2022
Himachal Pradesh MLAs 2003–2007
Himachal Pradesh MLAs 2012–2017

People from Himachal Pradesh
Panjab University alumni
 

1974 births